Schistura pertica is a species of ray-finned fish, a stone loach, in the genus Schistura. It has only been recorded once, in 1997, from a very small stream entering the Nam Ou River, downstream of the Muang Khoa River in northern Laos, it is expected to occur elsewhere in the Nam Ou drainage. It was observed in streams with a moderate to fast current, in riffles, over beds varying from gravel to stone

References

P
Fish described in 2000